In physiology, respiration is the movement of oxygen from the outside environment to the cells within tissues, and the removal of carbon dioxide in the opposite direction that's to the environment.

The physiological definition of respiration differs from the biochemical definition, which refers to a metabolic process by which an organism obtains energy (in the form of ATP and NADPH) by oxidizing nutrients and releasing waste products. Although physiologic respiration is necessary to sustain cellular respiration and thus life in animals, the processes are distinct: cellular respiration takes place in individual cells of the organism, while physiologic respiration concerns the diffusion and transport of metabolites between the organism and the external environment.

Gas exchanges in the lung occurs by ventilation and perfusion. Ventilation refers to the in and out movement of air of the lungs and perfusion is the circulation of blood in the pulmonary capillaries. In mammals, physiological respiration involves respiratory cycles of inhaled and exhaled breaths. Inhalation (breathing in) is usually an active movement that brings air into the lungs where the process of gas exchange takes place between the air in the alveoli and the blood in the pulmonary capillaries. Contraction of the diaphragm muscle cause a pressure variation, which is equal to the pressures caused by elastic, resistive and inertial components of the respiratory system. In contrast, exhalation (breathing out) is usually a passive process, though there are many exceptions: when generating functional overpressure (speaking, singing, humming, laughing, blowing, snorting, sneezing, coughing, powerlifting); when exhaling underwater (swimming, diving); at high levels of physiological exertion (running, climbing, throwing) where more rapid gas exchange is necessitated; or in some forms of breath-controlled meditation. Speaking and singing in humans requires sustained breath control that many mammals are not capable of performing. 

The process of breathing does not fill the alveoli with atmospheric air during each inhalation (about 350 ml per breath), but the inhaled air is carefully diluted and thoroughly mixed with a large volume of gas (about 2.5 liters in adult humans) known as the functional residual capacity which remains in the lungs after each exhalation, and whose gaseous composition differs markedly from that of the ambient air. Physiological respiration involves the mechanisms that ensure that the composition of the functional residual capacity is kept constant, and equilibrates with the gases dissolved in the pulmonary capillary blood, and thus throughout the body. Thus, in precise usage, the words breathing and ventilation are hyponyms, not synonyms, of respiration; but this prescription is not consistently followed, even by most health care providers, because the term respiratory rate (RR) is a well-established term in health care, even though it would need to be consistently replaced with ventilation rate if the precise usage were to be followed. During respiration the C-H bonds are broken by oxidation-reduction reaction and so carbon dioxide and water are also produced. The cellular energy-yielding process is called cellular respiration.

Classifications of respiration 
There are several ways to classify the physiology of respiration:

By species 
 Aquatic respiration
 Buccal pumping
 Cutaneous respiration
 Intestinal respiration
 Respiratory system

By mechanism 
 Breathing
 Gas exchange
 Arterial blood gas
 Control of respiration
 Apnea

By experiments 
 Huff and puff
 Spirometry
 Selected ion flow tube mass spectrometry

By intensive care and emergency medicine 
 CPR
 Mechanical ventilation
 Intubation
 Iron lung
 Intensive care medicine
 Liquid breathing
 ECMO
 Oxygen toxicity
 Medical ventilator
 Paramedic
 Life support
 General anaesthesia
 Laryngoscope

By other medical topics 
 Respiratory therapy
 Breathing gases
 Hyperbaric oxygen therapy
 Hypoxia
 Gas embolism
 Decompression sickness
 Barotrauma
 Oxygen equivalent
 Oxygen toxicity
 Nitrogen narcosis
 Carbon dioxide poisoning
 Carbon monoxide poisoning
 HPNS

Additional images

See also

References 

 Nelsons VCE Units 1–2 Physical Education. 2010 Cengage Copyright.

External links
 Overview at Johns Hopkins University

Further reading 
 
 , human biology 146149
 C.Michael Hogan. 2011. Respiration. Encyclopedia of Earth. Eds. Mark McGinley and C.J.Cleveland. National Council for Science and the Environment. Washington DC

Excretion

hr:Disanje